Human Error: Ways to Selfdestruction is the first full-length album by the blackened death metal band Crionics. It was released under Candlelight Records and recorded at Hertz Studio.

Track listing
All songs were written by War-A.N, except where noted.

 "Satanic Syndrome 666"  – 3:51 (Vac-V, War-A.N)
 "Waterfalls of Darkness" – 3:43 (Vac-V, War-A.N)
 "Lunatic Gate" – 5:38 (Aryman, War-A.N)
 "Hallowed Whores" – 4:13
 "Crionics" – 3:46 (Vac-V, War-A.N)
 "Episode of the Falling Star" – 5:04
 "Matrix of Piety" – 4:08 (Vac-V, War-A.N)
 "Precipice Gaped" – 4:21 (Bielewicz, War-A.N, Zieba)
 "Sacrosanct Strength" – 3:44 (War-A.N, Zieba)
 "Indoctrination Procedure" – 6:12

Notes
Bonus tracks:
 A bonus track Carpathian Forest was released worldwide; a cover from the Through Chasm, Caves and Titan Woods EP from the band Carpathian Forest.

Personnel
 Michał "War-A.N" Skotniczny - guitar, vocals
 Wacław "Vac-V" Borowiec - keymaster, synthesizer
 Marcotic – bass
 Maciej "Darkside" Kowalski - drums
 Sławek & Wojtek Wiesławscy - engineering, mixing, mastering
 Jacek Wiśniewsk - cover, designs

References

External links
 Encyclopaedia Metallum
 Hertz Studio 
 Cover Art & Design: Jacek Wisniewski

2002 albums
Crionics albums